The Don and Gee Nicholl Fellowships in Screenwriting is a fellowship program founded in 1986 to aid screenwriters. It is administered by the Academy of Motion Picture Arts and Sciences.

History

Gee Nicholl, widow of producer Don Nicholl, worked with Julian Blaustein in 1985 to develop the program with the Academy. The original 1986 winners were Allison Anders, Dennis Clontz, and Jeff Eugenides. 1989 fellow Radha Bharadwaj wrote the first screenplay made into a film, the 1991 drama Closet Land. Clontz won a Pulitzer Prize in 1994 and Eugenides won one in 2003. 1992 fellow Susannah Grant was the first nominated for an Academy Award, for the screenplay for Erin Brockovich. The fellowship celebrated its 25th year in 2010.

Beginning in 2013, a reading of scenes from winning screenplays have been performed by professional actors in front of an audience. In 2020 due to the coronavirus pandemic, the reading was conducted virtually. Actors that have participated in these readings over the years include: Kathy Baker, Elle Fanning, Ken Jeong, Gugu Mbatha-Raw, Freida Pinto, Alia Shawkat, Wes Studi, Blair Underwood, Vince Vaughn, and Anton Yelchin.

As of the 2013 contest, 17 winning scripts have later been produced.

Fellows

2020-present

2022 Nicholl Fellows 

 Jennifer Archer, Into the Deep Blue
 Callie Bloem and Christopher Ewing, Tape 22
 Sam Boyer, Ojek
 J.M. Levine, Operation Gemini
 Timothy Ware-Hill, Tyrone and the Looking Glass

2021 Nicholl Fellows

 Haley Hope Bartels, Pumping Black
 Karin delaPeña Collison, Coming of Age
 Byron Hamel, Shade of the Grapefruit Tree
 R.J. Daniel Hanna, Shelter Animal
 Laura Kosann, The Ideal Woman

2020 Nicholl Fellows
 James Acker, Sadboi
 Beth Curry, Lemon
 Vanar Jaddou, Goodbye, Iraq
 Kate Marks, The Cow of Queens
 Jane Therese, Sins of My Father

2010-2019

2019 Nicholl Fellows
 Aaron Chung, Princess Vietnam
 Karen McDermott, Lullabies of La Jaula
 Renee Pillai, Boy with Kite
 Sean Malcolm, Mother
 Walker McKnight, Street Rat Allie Punches Her Ticket

2018 Nicholl Fellows
 Allison Buckmelter and Nicolas Buckmelter, American Refugee
 Joey Clarke, Jr., Miles
 Grace Sherman, Numbers and Words
 Wenonah Wilms, Horsehead Girls

2017 Nicholl Fellows
 Vigil Chime, Bring Back Girl
 SJ Inwards, Jellyfish Summer
 Max Lance and Jen Bailey, The Queen of Sleaze
 KG Rockmaker, Last Days of Winter
 Cesar Vitale, The Great Nothing

2016 Nicholl Fellows
 Michele Atkins, Talking About the Sky 
 Spencer Harvey and Lloyd Harvey, Photo Booth   
 Geeta Malik, Dinner with Friends    
 Elizabeth Oyebode, Tween the Ropes   
 Justin Piasecki, Death of an Ortolan

2015 Nicholl Fellows
Amy Tofte, Addis Abeka
Andrew Friedhof, Great Falls
Anthony Grieco, Best Sellers (Produced)
Elizabeth Chomko, What They Had (Produced)
Sam Regnier, Free Agent

2014 Nicholl Fellows
Sam Baron, The Science of Love and Laughter
Alisha Brophy & Scott Miles, United States of Fuckin' Awesome
Melissa Iqbal, The Death Engine
Sallie West, Moonflower

2013 Nicholl Fellows
 Frank DeJohn & David Alton Hedges, Legion
 Patty Jones, Joe Banks
 Alan Roth, Jersey City Story
 Stephanie Shannon, Queen of Hearts
 Barbara Stepansky, Sugar in My Veins

2012 Nicholl Fellows
Nikole Beckwith, Stockholm, Pennsylvania (Produced)
Sean Robert Daniels, Killers
James DiLapo, Devils at Play
Allan Durand, Willie Francis Must Die Again
Michael Werwie, Extremely Wicked, Shockingly Evil and Vile (Produced)

2011 Nicholl Fellows
Chris Bessounian & Tianna Langham, Guns and Saris
Dion Cook, Cutter
John MacInnes, Outside the Wire
Matthew Murphy, Unicorn
Abel Vang & Burlee Vang, The Tiger's Child

2010 Nicholl Fellows
Destin Daniel Cretton, Short Term 12 (Produced)
Marvin Krueger, And Handled with a Chain
Andrew Lanham, The Jumper of Maine
Micah Ranum, A Good Hunter (Produced)
Cinthea Stahl, Identifying Marks

2000-2009
2009 Nicholl Fellows
Matt Ackley, Victoria Falls
Vineet Dewan and Angus Fletcher, Sand Dogs
John Griffin, Dream Before Waking
Nidhi Anna Verghese, Jallianwala Bagh
Jeff Williams, Pure

2008 Nicholl Fellows
Jeremy Bandow, Hive
Ken Kristensen & Colin Marshall, Out of Breath
Jason A. Micallef, Butter (Produced)
Eric Nazarian, Giants
Lee Patterson, Snatched

2007 Nicholl Fellows
Amy Garcia & Cecilia Contreras, Amelia Earhart and the Bologna Rainbow Highway
Michael L. Hare, The Fly Fisher
Sidney King, Kalona
David Mango, Kissing a Suicide Bomber
Andrew Shearer & Nicholas J. Sherman, Holy Irresistible

2006 Nicholl Fellows
Alfred E. Carpenter & Mark A. Matusof, 38 Mercury
Arthur M. Jolly, The Free Republic of Bobistan
Stephanie Lord, Palau Rain
Josh D. Schorr, 10 Day Contract
Scott K. Simonsen, Tides of Summer

2005 Nicholl Fellows
Morgan Read-Davidson, The Days Between
Seth Resnik & Ron Moskovitz, Fire in a Coal Mine
Michael D. Zungolo, No Country
Colleen Cooper De Maio, Pirates of Lesser Providence
Gian Marco Masoni, Ring of Fire

2004 Nicholl Fellows
Sean Mahoney, Fenian's Trace
Daniel Lawrence, The Gaza Golem
Doug Davidson, Letter Quest
Whit Rummel, The Secret Boy
John Sinclair & Nova Jacobs, Split Infinity

2003 Nicholl Fellows
Andrea R. Herman, Augmentation
Tejal K. Desai & Brian C. Wray, Linda and Henry
Annie Reid, Revival
Bragi Schut Jr., Season of the Witch (Produced)
James N. Mottern, Trucker (Produced)

2002 Nicholl Fellows
John Ciarlo, Bend in the River
Matt Harris, Moon of Popping Trees
Pamela Kay, Nude and Naked
Kurt Kuenne, Mason Mule
Creighton Rothenberger, The Chosin

2001 Nicholl Fellows
Patricia Burroughs, Redemption
Greg M. Dawless, One Hour Development
Robert S. Edwards, Land of the Blind (Produced)
Albert Letizia, The Northern Lights
Cameron B. Young, Saint Vincent

2000 Nicholl Fellows
Doug Atchison, Akeelah and the Bee (Produced)
Alfredo Botello, The Crasher
Gabrielle Burton, The Imperial Waltz
Christine R. Downs, Victory Road
James M. Foley, Powder River Breakdown

1990-1999
1999 Nicholl Fellows
Chris E. Balibrera, Harvest
T. J. Lynch, The Beginning of Wisdom
Annmarie E. Morais, Bleeding
Jaime David Silverman, Last Meals
Rebecca A. Sonnenshine, Mermaid Dreams

1998 Nicholl Fellows
Jacob A. Estes, Mean Creek (Produced)
Robert H. Gyde, Jelly-Babies
Donna McNeely, Julia's Child
Karen M. Moncrieff, Blue Car (Produced)
Michael A. Rich, Finding Forrester (Produced)

1997 Nicholl Fellows
Glen Craney, Whisper the Wind
Scott Ferraiolo, The Palace of Versailles
Anthony J. Jaswinski, Interstate
Karen Otoole, Wild Horses
Michele Sutter, This Place in the Ways

1996 Nicholl Fellows
Will Chandler, Cyrano of Linden View
Ehren Kruger, Arlington Road (Produced)
Carlton Proctor, Sommerville
Brian Teshera, ...In a Heartbeat
Craig von Wiederhold, Dead Eyes

1995 Nicholl Fellows
Richard Cray, Love, Squid & Pavarotti
Scott Fifer, Starstruck
Patrick Gilfillan, G.U. (Geographically Undesirable)
Robley Wilson, Land Fishers

1994 Nicholl Fellows
Max D. Adams, My Back Yard
Steve Garvin, Status Quo
Charles Henrich, Joshua Tree
Glenn Levin, Spano and the Kid

1993 Nicholl Fellows
Victoria Jennings Arch, A Terrible Beauty
Bob Bridges, Doniphan of the Americas
Myron E. Goble, Down in the Delta (Produced)
Jodi Ann Johnson, Mama & Me
Dawn O'Leary, Island of Brilliance (Produced)

1992 Nicholl Fellows
Robert N. Cohen, The Good Ole Boy
Susannah Grant, Island Girl
Andrew W. Marlowe, The Lehigh Pirates
Terri Edda Miller, Bedwarmer
Michelle Wollmers, Infidels

1991 Nicholl Fellows
Len Alaria, War Cry
Peter Crow, Trace
Raymond De Felitta, Begin the Beguine
Ronald Emmons, By Bread Alone
Brian Reich, Baubles

1990 Nicholl Fellows
David Gordon, Rocketman
Robert Gregory Browne, Low Tide
Kent Rizley, The Gentlemen
Thomas Smith, Slings and Arrows
Wanda Warner, Chief to Chief

1986-1989
1989 Nicholl Fellows
Radha Bharadwaj, Closet Land (Produced)
Mark Lowenthal, Where the Elephant Sits (Produced)
James McGlynn, Traveller (Produced)
Deborah Pryor, Briar Patch (Produced)
Laverne Stringer, The Cotton Gin Athletic Club

1988 Nicholl Fellows
No fellowships awarded

1987 Nicholl Fellows
Christopher Bishop, Swampers
Kevin Coffey, Fadeaway
Sallie Groo, Daughters of Music
Marie Angela Kellier, Solita's Rise
Randall McCormick, Giant Steps
Warren Taylor, In the Dark (Produced)
Priscilla Waggoner, Mother's Nature

1986 Nicholl Fellows
Allison Anders, Lost Highway
Dennis Clontz, Generations (play)
Jeff Eugenides, Here Comes Winston, Full of the Holy Spirit (fiction)

References

External links
Don and Gee Nicholl Fellowships in Screenwriting via Academy of Motion Picture Arts and Sciences

Academy of Motion Picture Arts and Sciences
Scholarships in the United States
Awards established in 1986
1986 establishments in the United States